Thestus is a genus of longhorn beetles of the subfamily Lamiinae, containing the following species:

 Thestus alexandra (Thomson, 1878)
 Thestus chassoti Breuning, 1973
 Thestus oncideroides Pascoe, 1866
 Thestus philippensis Schwarzer, 1929

References

Lamiini